P. Sankar (22 June 1915 – 12 October 1993) was an Indian politician and leader of Communist Party of India. He represented Chittur constituency in 5th Kerala Legislative Assembly.

Positions Held
Member, CPI State Council  
Central Committee, Communist Party of Ceylon (1943–52)
All India Agricultural Workers Union;  Vice President 
Assistant Secretary of the Ceylon Trade Union Federation
President, Malayalee Mahajana Sabha
Joined INC in 1935 and later worked in Ceylon
Joined the Lanka Sama Samaja Party in 1937 and later the United Socialist Party and the Communist Party of Sri Lanka
Returned to Kerala in 1952;  Member of the CPI State Council  
Secretary of the AITUC
Editor of Navshakti and Chenkathir

References

Communist Party of India politicians from Kerala
Communist Party of Sri Lanka politicians
Lanka Sama Samaja Party politicians
1915 births
1993 deaths
Kerala MLAs 1977–1979